Sir Charles Holroyd (9 April 1861 – 17 November 1917) was an English artist and curator. He was Keeper of the Tate from 1897 to 1906, and Director of the National Gallery from 1906 to 1916.

Biography

Early years
Charles Holroyd was born in Potternewton, Leeds and studied at Leeds Grammar School then Mining Engineering at Yorkshire College of Science.  From 1880 to 1884 received his art education under Professor Legros at the Slade School, University College, London, teaching there from 1885 to 1891. Holroyd, William Strang, and J. B. Clark are the three pupils of Legros mentioned in Arthur M. Hind’s A History of Engraving and Etching.
 
After passing six months at Newlyn, where he painted his first picture exhibited in the Royal Academy, Fishermen Mending a Sail (1885), he obtained a travelling scholarship and studied for two years in Italy, a sojourn which greatly influenced his art. He met his wife, the artist Fannie Fetherstonhaugh Macpherson, in Rome and they married in 1891.

At his return, on the invitation of Legros, he became for two years assistant-master at the Slade School, and there devoted himself to painting and etching.

Career
Among his pictures may be mentioned The Death of Torrigiano (1886), The Satyr King (1889), The Supper at Emmaus, and, perhaps his best picture, Pan and Peasants (1893).

For the church of Aveley, Essex, he painted a triptych altar-piece, The Adoration of the Shepherds, with wings representing St Michael and St Gabriel, and designed as well the window, The Resurrection. His portraits, such as that of GF Watts, RA, in the Legros manner, show much dignity and distinction.

Holroyd made his chief reputation as an etcher of exceptional ability, combining strength with delicacy, and a profound technical knowledge of the art. Among the best known are the Monte Oliveto series, the Icarus series, the Monte Subasio series, and the Eve series, together with the plates, The Flight into Egypt, The Prodigal Son, A Barn on Tadworth Common (etched in the open air), and The Storm. His etched heads of Professor Legros, Lord Courtney and Night, are admirable alike in knowledge and in likeness. His principal drypoint is The Bather.

According to the Encyclopædia Britannica Eleventh Edition, "[i]n all his work Holroyd displays an impressive sincerity, with a fine sense of composition, and of style, allied to independent and modern feeling." He was appointed the first keeper of the National Gallery of British Art (Tate Gallery) in 1897, and on the retirement of Sir Edward Poynter in 1906 he received the directorship of the National Gallery. Many important additions were made during his period as director, the chief of these being the Rokeby Venus by Velázquez. He also arranged for the transfer of a large portion of the Turner bequest to the Tate Gallery.

Holroyd was a member of the International Society of Sculptors, Painters and Gravers and was knighted in 1903. He was an active member of the Art Workers' Guild and was elected Master in 1905. His Michael Angelo Buonarotti (London, Duckworth, 1903) is a scholarly work of real value.  He died on 19 November 1917.

References

Further reading
Dodgson, Campbell Sir Charles Holroyd's Etchings The Print Collector’s Quarterly 1923 Oct Vol 10, No. 3, p309.
Dodgson, Campbell Etchings of Sir Charles Holroyd (Catalogue – partial) The Print Collector’s Quarterly  1923 Oct Vol 10, No. 3, p322.
Dodgson, Campbell Etchings of Sir Charles Holroyd (Catalogue, continued) The Print Collector’s Quarterly 1923 Dec Vol 10, No. 4, p347

External links

 
 
listing of 287 Holroyd prints, many with images artistarchive.com

1861 births
1917 deaths
19th-century English painters
20th-century English painters
Artists from Leeds
Artists' Rifles soldiers
Directors of the National Gallery, London
English curators
English male painters
Knights Bachelor
Painters from London
19th-century English male artists
19th-century British businesspeople
Masters of the Art Worker's Guild
20th-century English male artists